Great River may refer to:

Rivers
 Great River (Grenada)
 Great River (Jamaica)
 Nahr al-Kabir al-Janoubi, Arabic for "Great River"
 Connetquot River, New York, an Algonquian (Native American) word meaning "Great River"

Places
 Great River, New York

Film and literature 
Great River: The Rio Grande in North American History, a non-fiction book by Paul Horgan
 Great River (film), a 2010 Canadian film
 Anduin, a river in J. R. R. Tolkien's fictional Middle-earth, is also known as the Great River of Wilderland
 The Great River of Narnia in C. S. Lewis's fictional world

Other 
 Great River (LIRR station)
 Great River Regional Library, a multi-county public library system in the U.S. State of Minnesota.
 The Great River (train), a future passenger train service.

See also
Grand River (disambiguation)
Big River (disambiguation)